Eleonora Milusheva (born 8 April 1973) is a Bulgarian athlete. She competed in the women's high jump at the 2000 Summer Olympics.

References

1973 births
Living people
Athletes (track and field) at the 2000 Summer Olympics
Bulgarian female high jumpers
Olympic athletes of Bulgaria
Place of birth missing (living people)